Amtrak Blues is an album by the American blues and jazz musician Alberta Hunter, released in 1980. The album was nominated for a W. C. Handy Award, in the "Traditional Blues Album" category; Hunter won the 1980 award for best "Traditional Blues Female Artist".

Production
The album was produced by John Hammond. Hunter was backed by the Gerald Cook quartet on a few of the album's tracks; Hunter's resurgence was in part due to Cook's championing.

Critical reception

Robert Christgau wrote that Hunter's "timing and intonation are as savvy as you'd figure, and though the voice isn't quite as full as it must have been, it packs an amazing wallop." The Boston Globe thought that the album "exquisitely captures Hunter's spunk, wry humor and zest for life," writing that "Hunter snaps, crackles and pops in a way younger singers can't touch." High Fidelity called it "a bright, clean recording that brings out the warm, vivid colors in her incredibly lively voice." Cadence lamented that the musicians often played "quiet, uninspired cocktail runs."

Colin Larkin opined that Hunter "inimitably interpreted every nuance of the lyrics, especially when they were her own." The Rolling Stone Album Guide stated that Amtrak Blues "accurately captures the sassy strength of her singing." The Penguin Guide to Blues Recordings wrote: "Inevitably, 'marvellous for her age' was used as a selling point, but in sober truth Hunter's accuracy, timing and vigour were pretty astonishing."

Track listing

Personnel
Alberta Hunter - vocals
Doc Cheatham - trumpet
Gerald Cook - piano
Vic Dickenson - trombone
Norris Turney - reeds
Frank Wess - reeds

References

1980 albums
Columbia Records albums
Blues albums by American artists